Historically, astrological and astronomical symbols overlapped. Frequently used symbols include signs of the zodiac and classical planets. These originate from medieval Byzantine codices. Their current form is a product of the European Renaissance. Other symbols for astrological aspects are used in various astrological traditions.

History and origin
Symbols for the classical planets, zodiac signs, aspects, lots, and the lunar nodes appear in the medieval Byzantine codices in which many ancient horoscopes were preserved. In the original papyri of these Greek horoscopes, there was a circle with the glyph representing shine for the Sun; and a crescent for the Moon.

Classical planets
The written symbols for Mercury, Venus, Jupiter, and Saturn have been traced to forms found in late Classical Greek papyri. The symbols for Jupiter and Saturn are monograms of the initial letters of the corresponding Greek names, and the symbol for Mercury is a stylized caduceus. A.S.D. Maunder finds antecedents of the planetary symbols in earlier sources, used to represent the gods associated with the classical planets. Bianchini's planisphere, produced in the 2nd century, shows Greek personifications of planetary gods charged with early versions of the planetary symbols: Mercury has a caduceus; Venus has, attached to her necklace, a cord connected to another necklace; Mars, a spear; Jupiter, a staff; Saturn, a scythe; the Sun, a circlet with rays radiating from it; and the Moon, a headdress with a crescent attached. A diagram in Johannes Kamateros' 12th century Compendium of Astrology shows the Sun represented by the circle with a ray, Jupiter by the letter zeta (the initial of Zeus, Jupiter's counterpart in Greek mythology), Mars by a shield crossed by a spear, and the remaining classical planets by symbols resembling the modern ones, without the cross-mark seen in modern versions of the symbols.

The modern sun symbol, pictured as a circle with a dot, first appeared in the Renaissance. (The conventional symbols for the signs of the zodiac also develop in the Renaissance period as simplifications of the classical pictorial representations of the signs.)
The modern sun symbol resembles the Egyptian hieroglyph for "sun" – a circle that sometimes had a dot in the center,.
It is not known if the Egyptian and Chinese logographs have any connection to the European astrological symbol.

Major planets discovered in the modern era
Symbols for Uranus and Neptune were created shortly after their discovery. For Uranus, two variant symbols are seen. One symbol, invented by J. G. Köhler and refined by Bode, was intended to represent the newly discovered metal platinum; since platinum, sometimes described as white gold was found by chemists mixed with iron, the symbol for platinum combines the alchemical symbols for iron, ♂, and gold, ☉. An inverted version of that same symbol,  was in use in the early 20th century. Another symbol, was suggested by Lalande in 1784. In a letter to Herschel, Lalande described it as "un globe surmonté par la première lettre de votre nom" ("a globe surmounted by the first letter of your name"). After Neptune was discovered, the Bureau des Longitudes proposed the name Neptune and the familiar trident for the planet's symbol, though at bottom may be either a cross  or an orb .

Asteroids
The astrological symbols for the first four objects discovered at the beginning of the 19th century — Ceres, Pallas, Juno and Vesta — were created shortly after their discoveries. They were initially listed as planets, and half a century later came to be called asteroids, though such "minor planets" continued to be considered planets for perhaps another century. Shortly after Giuseppe Piazzi's discovery of Ceres, a group of astronomers ratified the name, proposed by the discoverer, and chose the sickle as a symbol of the planet. The symbol for Pallas, the spear of Pallas Athena, was invented by Baron Franz Xaver von Zach, and introduced in his Monatliche Correspondenz zur Beförderung der Erd- und Himmels-Kunde. Karl Ludwig Harding, who discovered and named Juno, assigned to it the symbol of a scepter topped with a star.

The modern astrological form of the symbol for Vesta, ⚶, was created by Eleanor Bach, who is credited with pioneering the use of the big four asteroids with the publication of her Ephemerides of the Asteroids in the early 1970s. The original form of the symbol for Vesta, was created by German mathematician Carl Friedrich Gauss. Olbers, having previously discovered and named one new planet (as the asteroids were then classified), gave Gauss the honor of naming his newest discovery. Gauss decided to name the planet for the goddess Vesta, and also specified that the symbol should be the altar of the goddess with the sacred fire burning on it.
Bach's variant was a simplification of 19th-century elaborations of Gauss's altar symbol.

Centaurs
The symbol for the centaur Chiron, ⚷, is both a key and a monogram of the letters O and K (for 'Object Kowal', a provisional name of the object, for discoverer Charles T. Kowal) was proposed by astrologer Al Morrison, who presented the symbol as "an inspiration shared amongst Al H. Morrison, Joelle K.D. Mahoney, and Marlene Bassoff."

A widely used convention for other centaurs, proposed by Robert von Heeren in the 1990s, is to replace the K of the Chiron key glyph with the initial letter of the object: e.g. P or φ for Pholus and N for Nessus.

Trans-Neptunian objects
Pluto, like Uranus, has multiple symbols in use. One symbol, ♇, is a monogram of the letters PL (which can be interpreted to stand for Pluto or for astronomer Percival Lowell), was announced with the name of the new planet by the discoverers on May 1, 1930. Another symbol, which was popularized in Paul Clancy's astrological publications, is based on Pluto's bident: . This symbol is described by Dane Rudhyar as "suggest[ing] the planetary character of the Pluto mind by the circle, floating above the open cup."  Although, this meaning is readily debatable due to Blavatskian origins, rather than a properly traditional understanding, such as may be found in Hermeticism.

Symbols for other large trans-Neptunian objects have mostly been proposed on the Internet; some created by Denis Moskowitz have been used by NASA
and are used by the popular open-source astrological software Astrolog, as well as being used less consistently by commercial programs.

Miscellaneous orbital stations
An 'R' with a tail stroke was used to abbreviate many words beginning with the letter 'R'; in medical prescriptions, it abbreviated the word recipe (from the Latin imperative of recipere "to take"), and in missals, an R with a tail stroke marked the responses.

Meanings of the symbols

Signs of the zodiac

Planets 

The symbols of the planets are usually (but not always) broken down into four common elements by astrologers: A circle denoting spirit, a crescent denoting the mind, a cross denoting practical/physical matter and an arrow denoting action or direction. This is not the historical origin of the symbols. (The cross, for example, was an attempt to Christianize pagan symbols.)

Asteroids and other celestial bodies 

Since the 1970s, some astrologers have used asteroids and other celestial bodies in their horoscopes. The symbol for the first-recognised centaur, 2060 Chiron, was devised by Al H. Morrison soon after it had been discovered by Charles Kowal, and has become standard amongst astrologers. In the late 1990s, German astrologer Robert von Heeren created symbols for other centaurs based on the Chiron model, though only those for 5145 Pholus and 7066 Nessus are included in Unicode, and only that for Pholus in Astrolog. The following list by no means exhaustive and confines itself to bodies that are in Unicode or are mentioned by Unicode proposals.

The Hamburg School of Astrology, also called Uranian Astrology, is a sub-variety of western astrology.  It adds eight fictitious trans-Neptunian planets to the normal ones used by western astrologers:

Aspects

In astrology, an aspect is an angle the planets make to each other in the horoscope, also to the ascendant, midheaven, descendant, lower midheaven, and other points of astrological interest. The following symbols are used to note aspect:

Russian aspects
In addition to the aspect symbols above, some Russian astrologers use additional or unique aspect symbols:

Miscellaneous symbols

See also

 Alchemical symbols
 Aztec calendar
 Behenian fixed star
 Classical elements
 Earthly Branches
 Gender symbols
 Heavenly Stems
 Maya calendar
 Monas Hieroglyphica
 Nakshatra
 Navagraha
 Sexagenary cycle
 Sri Rama Chakra
 Vedic astrology

Notes

References

External links 
 

Astrology
Astronomical symbols
Religious symbols
Symbols
Western astrological signs
Heraldic charges
Unicode